Aleksander (Alex) Hämäläinen (20 July 1894, Mikkelin maalaiskunta - 28 August 1943) was a Finnish farmworker, logger, party functionary and politician. He was a member of the Parliament of Finland from 1930 until his death in 1943, representing the Social Democratic Party of Finland (SDP).

References

1894 births
1943 deaths
People from Mikkeli
People from Mikkeli Province (Grand Duchy of Finland)
Social Democratic Party of Finland politicians
Members of the Parliament of Finland (1930–33)
Members of the Parliament of Finland (1933–36)
Members of the Parliament of Finland (1936–39)
Members of the Parliament of Finland (1939–45)
Finnish people of World War II